The Kid from Kansas  is a 1941 American drama set on a fictional island banana plantation owned  by Juan Garcia Pancho (Leo Carrillo). Foreman Andy (Andy Devine) befriends newcomer Kansas (Dick Foran), but Pancho is leery of the stranger.  Sabotage and seemingly bad luck befall Pancho and the other island plantation owners, coincidentally at the same time Kansas arrives on the scene. Fruit dealer Lee Walker (James Seay) announces a drop in prices. Before it can be taken to market, Pancho's entire crop is burned by an arsonist, and a plantation worker dies in the fire. The railroad tracks are destroyed and the workers call for a strike. Someone deliberately introduces an imported strain of banana fungus on all the plantations. Pancho is certain Kansas is involved. As things go from bad to worse, it is revealed that the chain of events were engineered by Walker, and that Kansas is a special undercover agent sent to investigate.

Cast
Leo Carrillo – Juan Garcia Pancho 
Dick Foran – Kansas
Andy Devine – Andy
Francis McDonald – Cesar
James Seay – Lee Walker

References

External links
 
 
 
 

1941 films
1941 drama films
American black-and-white films
American drama films
Films directed by William Nigh
Universal Pictures films
1940s English-language films
1940s American films